Panggisari is a village in the town of Mandiraja, Banjarnegara Regency, Central Java Province, Indonesia. this village has an area of 259.74 hectares and a population of 4,251 inhabitants in 2010.

References

External links
 Banjarnegara Regency Official Website
 BPS Kabupaten Banjarnegara

Banjarnegara Regency
Villages in Central Java